Charles Henry Everett (1835 – 15 January 1896) was an English cricketer.

Everett was born at Chiddingfold, Surrey in 1835.

He played a single first-class match for Hampshire in 1861 against the Marylebone Cricket Club.

Everett died at Sidmouth, Devon on 15 January 1896.

Family
Everett's brother-in-law, William Stewart represented Hampshire and Oxford University in first-class cricket. Everett's other brother-in-law, Herbert Stewart also represented Hampshire in first-class cricket.

External links
Charles Everett at Cricinfo
Charles Everett at CricketArchive

1835 births
1896 deaths
Cricketers from Surrey
English cricketers
Hampshire cricketers
People from the Borough of Waverley